This is a list of settlements in the Drama regional unit, Greece.

 Achladea
 Adriani
 Agia Paraskevi
 Agios Athanasios
 Agora
 Ano Pyxari
 Anthochori
 Argyroupoli
 Charitomeni
 Choristi
 Chrysokefalos
 Dasoto
 Doxato
 Drama
 Exochi
 Fotolivos
 Ftelia
 Grammeni
 Granitis
 Kalamon
 Kalampaki
 Kali Vrysi
 Kallifytos
 Kallithea
 Kalos Agros
 Katafyto
 Kato Nevrokopi
 Kato Vrontou
 Kefalari
 Kokkinogeia
 Koudounia
 Kyrgia
 Lefkogeia
 Livadero
 Makryplagio
 Mavrolefki
 Mavrovatos
 Megalokampos
 Mikrochori
 Mikrokampos
 Mikrokleisoura
 Mikromilia
 Mikropoli
 Monastiraki
 Mylopotamos
 Nerofraktis
 Nikiforos
 Nikotsaras
 Ochyro
 Pagonerio
 Panorama
 Paranesti
 Perichora
 Perithorio
 Petroussa
 Pigadia
 Platania
 Platanovrysi
 Potamoi
 Prosotsani
 Ptelea
 Pyrgoi
 Sidironero
 Silli
 Sitagroi
 Skaloti
 Tholos
 Vathylakkos
 Volakas
 Xiropotamos
 Ypsili Rachi

By municipality

See also
Slavic toponyms of places in Drama Prefecture
List of towns and villages in Greece

 
Drama